The 1965 NCAA University Division baseball tournament was played at the end of the 1965 NCAA University Division baseball season to determine the national champion of college baseball.  The tournament concluded with eight teams competing in the College World Series, a double-elimination tournament in its nineteenth year.  Eight regional districts sent representatives to the College World Series with preliminary rounds within each district serving to determine each representative.  These events would later become known as regionals.  Each district had its own format for selecting teams, resulting in 23 teams participating in the tournament at the conclusion of their regular season, and in some cases, after a conference tournament.  The nineteenth tournament's champion was Arizona State, coached by Bobby Winkles.  The Most Outstanding Player was Sal Bando of Arizona State.

Regionals
The opening rounds of the tournament were played across seven district sites across the country, each consisting of a field of two to four teams. Each district tournament, except District 2, was double-elimination. The winners of each district advanced to the College World Series.

Bold indicates winner.  * indicates extra innings.

District 1 at Boston, MA

District 2 at Princeton, NJ

District 3 at Gastonia, NC

District 4 at Oxford, OH

District 5 at St. Louis, MO

District 6
Texas automatically qualified for the College World Series out of District 6.

District 7 at Phoenix, AZ

District 8

College World Series

Participants

Results

Bracket

Game results

All-Tournament Team
The following players were members of the All-Tournament Team.

Notable players
 Arizona State: John Pavlik, Sal Bando, Duffy Dyer, Rick Monday, Al Schmelz
 Connecticut:
 Florida State: Randy Brown, Jim Lyttle
 Lafayette:
 Ohio State: Steve Arlin, Chuck Brinkman, Russ Nagelson
 St. Louis:
 Texas: Joe Hague, Gary Moore
 Washington State: Danny Frisella

Tournament notes 
 Ohio State's 15 inning victory over Washington State is the longest game in College World Series history

See also
 1965 NAIA World Series

References

NCAA Division I Baseball Championship
Tournament